The LXIV Legislature of the Mexican Congress was the meeting of the Mexican Congress of the Union that convened on 1 September 2018 and ended on 31 August 2021. It is composed of the 500 federal deputies and 128 senators elected in the 2018 Mexican general election. While the deputies will serve only in the LXIV Legislature, the senators, elected to six-year terms, will also form the Senate in the LXV Legislature, which will convene in 2021.

Highlights

The LXIV Legislature is noteworthy for its gender parity, with the most women ever elected to the Chamber of Deputies and Senate. Women will hold 49 percent of the seats in the Senate, a national record and the third-highest percentage of women in a current national upper house, according to data collected by the Interparliamentary Union. The Chamber of Deputies will have the fourth-highest percentage of women among lower houses.
In the Chamber of Deputies, this was the first election to be conducted after a 2017 redistricting of the federal electoral districts conducted by the National Electoral Institute. In reapportionment, Mexico City lost three seats, while seven states added a seat and four states lost one seat each.
On August 23, the PRI, PRD, PAN and Movimiento Ciudadano announced they would challenge the allocation of proportional representation seats in the Chamber of Deputies, saying MORENA is overrepresented.

Composition

Senate

Chamber of Deputies

Leadership

Senate

Presiding
 Martí Batres Guadarrama (MRN), 2018–2019
 Mónica Fernández Balboa (MRN), 2019–2020
 Oscar Eduardo Ramírez Aguilar (MRN), 2020–2021

Party Leadership
 PAN Leader: Damián Zepeda Vidales, 2018
 Rafael Moreno Valle Rosas, 2018
 Mauricio Kuri González, from 2018
 PRI Leader: Miguel Ángel Osorio Chong
 PRD Leader: Miguel Ángel Mancera
 PT Leader: Alejandro González Yáñez, until 2019
 Geovanna Bañuelos de la Torre, from 2019
 PVEM Leader: Manuel Velasco Coello, 2018
 Raúl Bolaños Cacho Cué, from 2018
 MC Leader: Dante Delgado Rannauro
 MRN Leader: Ricardo Monreal Ávila
 PES Leader: Sasil de León Villard

Chamber of Deputies

Presiding
 Porfirio Muñoz Ledo (MRN), 2018–2019
 Laura Rojas Hernández (PAN), 2019–2020
 Dulce María Sauri Riancho (PRI), 2020–2021

Party Leadership
 PAN Leader: Juan Carlos Romero Hicks
 PRI Leader: René Juárez Cisneros
 PRD Leader: Ricardo Gallardo Cardona, until 2019
 Verónica Juárez Piña, from 2019
 PT Leader: Reginaldo Sandoval Flores
 PVEM Leader: Arturo Escobar y Vega
 MC Leader: Alberto Esquer Gutiérrez, 2018
 Itzcóatl Tonatiuh Bravo Padilla, 2018–2021
 Fabiola Loya Hernández, from 2021
 MRN Leader: Mario Martin Delgado, until 2020
 Ignacio Mier Velazco, from 2020
 PES Leader: Fernando Manzanilla Prieto, until 2019
 Olga Juliana Elizondo Guerra, 2019
 Jorge Argüelles Victorero, from 2019

Membership

Senate

The Senate is composed of 128 seats; three each elected from each of Mexico's 32 federative entities for a total of 96, as well as 32 proportional representation seats.

Aguascalientes
 Martha Cecilia Márquez Alvarado (PAN)
 Juan Antonio Martín del Campo (PAN)
 Daniel Gutiérrez Castorena (MRN)

Baja California
 Jaime Bonilla Valdez (MRN), until 6 December 2018
 Gerardo Novelo Osuna (MRN), from 6 December 2018
 Alejandra León Gastélum (PT)
 Gina Cruz Blackledge (PAN)

Baja California Sur
 Víctor Manuel Castro Cosío (MRN), until 2 December 2018
 Ricardo Velázquez Meza (MRN), from 6 December 2018
 Lucía Trasviña Waldenrath (MRN)
 María Guadalupe Saldaña Cisneros (PAN), until 10 February 2021
 Audelia Esthela Villarreal Zavala (PAN), from 11 February 2021

Campeche
 Aníbal Ostoa Ortega (MRN), until 1 February 2021
 Arturo Moo Cahuich (MRN), from 1 February 2021
 Cecilia Margarita Sánchez García (MRN)
 Rocío Adriana Abreu Artiñano (MRN)

Chiapas
 Eduardo Ramírez Aguilar (MRN)
 Sasil de León Villard (PES)
 Noé Castañón Ramírez (MC)

Chihuahua
 Bertha Alicia Caraveo Camarena (MRN)
 Cruz Pérez Cuéllar (MRN)
 Gustavo Madero Muñoz (PAN)

Coahuila
 Armando Guadiana Tijerina (MRN), until 1 January 2021
 Vacant
 Eva Eugenia Galaz Caletti (MRN)
 Verónica Martínez García (PRI)

Colima
 Joel Padilla Peña (PT)
 Gricelda Valencia de la Mora (MRN)
 Gabriela Benavides Cobos (PVEM)

Durango
 Alejandro González Yáñez (PT), until 5 March 2019
 Miguel Ángel Lucero Olivas (PT), from 5 March 2019
 Lilia Margarita Valdéz Martínez (MRN)
 José Ramón Enríquez Herrera (MRN)

Guanajuato
 Alejandra Noemí Reynoso Sánchez (PAN)
 Erandi Bermúdez Méndez (PAN)
 Martha Lucía Mícher Camarena (MRN)

Guerrero
 Félix Salgado Macedonio (MRN), until 31 August 2020
 Saúl López Sollano (MRN), from 22 September 2020
 Nestora Salgado (MRN)
 Manuel Añorve Baños (PRI)

Hidalgo
 Angélica García Arrieta (MRN), until 22 December 2018
 María Merced González González (MRN), from 2 January 2019
 Julio Ramón Menchaca Salazar (MRN)
 Nuvia Mayorga Delgado (PRI)

Jalisco
 Clemente Castañeda Hoeflich (MC)
 Verónica Delgadillo García (MC), until 11 March 2021
 Ruth Alejandra López Hernández (MC), from 11 March 2021
 María Antonia Cárdenas Mariscal (MRN)

Mexico
 Delfina Gómez Álvarez (MRN), until 2 December 2018
 Martha Guerrero Sánchez (MRN), from 4 December 2018
 Higinio Martínez Miranda (MRN)
 Juan Manuel Zepeda Hernández (PAN)

Mexico City
 Martí Batres Guadarrama (MRN)
 Citlalli Hernández Mora (MRN), until 14 September 2020
 María Celeste Sánchez Sugía (MRN), from 14 October 2020
 Emilio Álvarez Icaza (I)

Michoacán
 Blanca Estela Peña Gudiño (MRN)
 Cristóbal Arias Solís (MRN), until 21 January 2021
 José Alfonso Solórzano Fraga (MRN), from 2 February 2021
 Antonio García Conejo (PRD), until 4 March 2021
 Marco Trejo Pureco (PRD), from 8 March 2021

Morelos
 Lucía Virginia Meza Guzmán (MRN)
 Radamés Salazar Solorio (MRN), until 21 February 2021
 Sergio Pérez Flores (MRN), from 2 March 2021
 Ángel García Yáñez (PRI)

Nayarit
 Cora Cecilia Pinedo Alonso (MRN)
 Miguel Ángel Navarro Quintero (MRN), until 15 December 2020
 Vacant
 Gloria Elizabeth Núñez Sánchez (PRI), until 26 February 2021
 Martha María Rodríguez Domínguez

Nuevo León
 Samuel García Sepúlveda (MC), until 18 November 2020
 Luis David Ortiz Salinas (MC), from 19 November 2020
 Indira Kempis Martínez (MC)
 Víctor Oswaldo Fuentes Solís (PRI)

Oaxaca
 Susana Harp (MRN), until 19 May 2020; from 12 August 2020
 Concepción Rueda Gómez, from 29 June to 12 August 2020
 Salomón Jara Cruz (MRN)
 Raúl Bolaños Cacho Cué (PVEM)

Puebla
 Alejandro Armenta Mier (MRN)
 Nancy de la Sierra Arámburo (PT)
 Nadia Navarro Acevedo (PAN), until 8 April 2021
 Vacant

Querétaro
 Mauricio Kuri González (PAN), until 2 February 2021
 Alfredo Botello Montes (PAN), from 2 February 2021
 Guadalupe Murguía Gutiérrez (PAN)
 Gilberto Herrera Ruiz (MRN)

Quintana Roo
 Marybel Villegas Canché (MRN)
 José Luis Pech Varguez (MRN)
 Mayuli Martínez Simón (PAN), until 8 April 2021
 Vacant

San Luis Potosí
 Leonor Noyola Cervantes (PVEM), until 4 March 2021
 Graciela Gaitán Díaz (PVEM), from 10 March 2021
 Marco Antonio Gama Basarte (PAN), until 15 October 2020
 Francisco Javier Salazar Sáenz (PAN), from 15 October 2020
 Primo Dothe Mata (MRN)

Sinaloa
 Rubén Rocha Moya (MRN), until 5 March 2021
 Raúl de Jesús Elenes Angulo (MRN), from 9 March 2021
 Imelda Castro Castro (MRN)
 Mario Zamora Gastélum (PRI), until 4 March 2021
 Heriberto Galindo Quiñones, from 9 March 2021

Sonora
 Lilly Téllez (PAN)
 Alfonso Durazo Montaño (MRN), until 8 November 2018
 Arturo Bours Griffith (MRN), from 8 November 2018
 Sylvana Beltrones Sánchez (PRI)

Tabasco
 Mónica Fernández Balboa (MRN)
 Javier May Rodríguez (MRN)
 Juan Manuel Fócil Pérez (PRD)

Tamaulipas
 Américo Villarreal Anaya (MRN)
 María Guadalupe Covarrubias Cervantes (MRN)
 Ismael García Cabeza de Vaca (PAN)

Tlaxcala
 Ana Lilia Rivera Rivera (MRN)
 José Antonio Álvarez Lima (MRN), until 28 February 2019; from 20 November 2020
 Joel Molina Ramírez (MRN), from 28 February 2019 to 24 October 2020
 Minerva Hernández Ramos (PAN)

Veracruz
 Rocío Nahle García (MRN), until 27 November 2018
 Gloria Sánchez Hernández (MRN), from 29 November 2018
 Ricardo Ahued Bardahuil (MRN)
 Julen Rementería del Puerto (PAN)

Yucatán
 Jorge Carlos Ramírez Marín (PRI), until 8 April 2021
 Jorge Alberto Habib Abimerhi (PRI)
 Verónica Noemí Camino Farjat (MRN), until 8 April 2021
 María Marena López García (MRN), from 13 April 2021
 Raúl Paz Alonzo (PAN)

Zacatecas
 María Soledad Luévano Cantú (MRN)
 José Narro Céspedes (MRN)
 Claudia Anaya Mota (PRI), until 4 March 2021
 Evelia Sandoval Urban (PRI), from 4 March 2021

Senators by proportional representation

PAN List
 Josefina Vázquez Mota (PAN)
 Xóchitl Gálvez Ruiz (PRD)
 Indira Rosales San Román (PAN)
 Damián Zepeda Vidales (PAN)
 Kenia López Rabadán (PAN)
 Rafael Moreno Valle Rosas (PAN), until 24 December 2018
 Roberto Moya Clemente (PAN), from 2 January 2019

PRI List
 Claudia Ruiz Massieu Salinas (PRI)
 Carlos Humberto Aceves (PRI)
 Vanessa Rubio Márquez (PRI), until 16 July 2020
 Nancy Guadalupe Sánchez Arredondo (MRN), from 16 July 2020
 Miguel Ángel Osorio Chong (PRI)
 Beatriz Paredes Rangel (PRI)
 Eruviel Ávila Villegas (PRI)

PRD List
 Miguel Ángel Mancera (PRD)
 Israel Zamora Guzmán (PVEM)

PT List
 Geovanna Bañuelos de la Torre (PT)

PVEM List
 Alejandra Lagunes (PVEM)
 Manuel Velasco Coello (PVEM)

MC List
 Patricia Mercado (MC)
 Dante Delgado Rannauro (MC)

MRN List
 Antares Vázquez Alatorre (MRN)
 Héctor Vasconcelos (MRN)
 Olga Sánchez Cordero (MRN), until 29 November 2018
 Jesusa Rodríguez (MRN), from 29 November 2018
 Ricardo Monreal Ávila (MRN)
 Ifigenia Martínez (MRN)
 Napoleón Gómez Urrutia (MRN)
 Elvia Marcela Mora Arellano (PES)
 Germán Martínez Cázares (MRN)
 Katya Elizabeth Ávila Vázquez (PES)
 Casimiro Méndez Ortiz (MRN)
 Eunice Renata Romo Molina (PES)
 Gabriel García Hernández (MRN), until 29 November 2018
 José Alejandro Peña Villa (MRN), from 29 November 2018
 Claudia Balderas Espinoza (MRN)

Chamber of Deputies

The Chamber of Deputies is composed of 500 seats, elected from 300 single-member federal electoral districts and 40 apiece from five proportional representation electoral regions.

Aguascalientes
 1. Francisco Javier Luevano Nuñez (PAN)
 2. Elba Lorena Torres Díaz (PT)
 3. Martha Elisa González Estrada (PAN)

Baja California
 1. Jesús Salvador Minor Mora (MRN)
 2. Marina del Pilar Ávila Olmeda (MRN)
 3. Armando Reyes Ledesma (PT)
 4. Socorro Andaloza Gómez (MRN)
 5. Mario Ismael Moreno Gil (MRN)
 6. Javier Castañeda Pomposo (MRN)
 7. Érik Morales (MRN)
 8. Héctor Cruz Aparicio (PES)

Baja California Sur
 1. Ana Ruth García Grande (MRN)
 2. Alfredo Porras Domínguez (PT)

Campeche
 1. Carlos Martínez Ake (MRN)
 2. Irasema Buenfil Díaz (MRN)

Chiapas
 1. Manuela Obrador Narváez (MRN)
 2. Humberto Pedrero Moreno (MRN)
 3. Alfredo Vázquez Vázquez (MRN)
 4. Roque Luis Rabelo Velasco (MRN)
 5. Clementina Dekker Gómez (PT)
 6. Zoé Robledo Aburto (MRN) 
 Raúl Bonifaz Moedano (MRN) 
 7. Miguel Prado de los Santos (MRN)
 8. María Roselia Jiménez Pérez (PT)
 9. Leticia Aguilar Molina (MRN)
 10. Juan Farrera Esponda (MRN)
 11. Roberto Rubio Montejo (PVEM)
 12. José Luis Elorza Flores (MRN)
 13. Maricruz Roblero Gordillo (PT)

Chihuahua
 1. Esther Mejía Cruz (MRN)
 2. Maité Vargas Meraz (MRN)
 3. Claudia Elena Lastra Muñoz (PT)
 4. Ulises García Soto (MRN)
 5. Mario Mata Carrasco (PAN)
 6. Miguel Riggs Baeza (PAN)
 7. Eraclio Rodríguez Gómez (PT)
 8. Alan Falomir Sáenz (MC)
 9. Ángeles Gutiérrez Valdez (PAN)

Ciudad de Mexico
 1. Erika del Castillo Ibarra (PES)
 2. Armando González Escoto (MRN)
 3. Miguel Ángel Jáuregui (MRN)
 4. Gerardo Fernández Noroña (PT)
 5. Claudia López Rayón (MRN)
 6. Sergio Mayer (MRN)
 7. Beatriz Rojas Martínez (PES)
 8. María Rosete Sánchez (PT)
 9. Adriana Espinosa de los Monteros (PT)
 10. Javier Hidalgo Ponce (MRN)
 11. Rocío Barrera Badillo (MRN)
 12. Dolores Padierna Luna (MRN)
 13. Mario Martín Delgado (MRN) 
 Oscar Gutiérrez Camacho (MRN) 
 14. Alfonso Ramírez Cuéllar (MRN)
 15. Luis Alberto Mendoza Acevedo (PAN)
 16. Lorena Villavicencio Ayala (MRN)
 17. Francisco Javier Saldívar Camacho (PT)
 18. Ana María Rodríguez Ruiz (MRN)
 19. Aleida Alavez Ruiz (MRN)
 20. Ana Karina Rojo Pimentel (MRN)
 21. Flor Ivone Morales Miranda (PT)
 22. Víctor Varela López (PES)
 23. Pablo Gómez Álvarez (MRN)
 24. Guadalupe Ramos Sotelo (MRN)

Coahuila
 1. Lenin Pérez Rivera (PAN)
 2. Francisco Javier Borrego Adame (MRN)
 3. Melba Farías Zambrano (MRN)
 4. Martha Garay Cadena (PRI)
 5. Luis Fernando Salazar Fernández (MRN)
 6. José Ángel Pérez Hernández (PES)
 7. Fernando de las Fuentes Hernández (PRI)

Colima
 1. Claudia Yáñez Centeno (MRN)
 2. Indira Vizcaíno Silva (PT)

Durango
 1. Martha Olivia García Vidaña (MRN)
 2. Alma Marina Vitela (PES)
 3. Maribel Aguilera Cháirez (MRN)
 4. Hilda Patricia Ortega Nájera (MRN)

Guanajuato
 1. Ariel Rodríguez Vázquez (MC)
 2. Ricardo Villarreal García (PAN)
 3. Ángeles Ayala Díaz (PAN)
 4. Juan Carlos Romero Hicks (PAN)
 5. Éctor Jaime Ramírez Barba (PAN)
 6. María del Pilar Ortega Martínez (PAN)
 7. Karen González Márquez (PAN)
 8. Justino Arriaga Rojas (PAN)
 9. Janet Melanie Murillo Chávez (PAN)
 10. Lilia Villafuerte Zavala (PVEM)
 11. Jorge Arturo Espadas Galván (PAN)
 12. Sarai Núñez Cerón (PAN)
 13. Emmanuel Reyes Carmona (MRN)
 14. María Eugenia Espinosa Rivas (PAN)
 15. Sergio Fernando Ascencio Barba (PAN)

Guerrero
 1. Víctor Alfonso Mojica Wences (PT)
 2. Araceli Ocampo Manzanares (PES)
 3. María del Carmen Cabrera Lagunas (MRN)
 4. Abelina López Rodríguez (MRN)
 5. Javier Manzano Salazar (MRN)
 6. Raymundo García Gutiérrez (PRD)
 7. Carlos Sánchez Barrios (MRN)
 8. Rubén Cayetano García (MRN)
 9. María del Rosario Merlín (PT)

Hidalgo
 1. Fortunato Rivera Castillo (MRN)
 2. Cipriano Charrez Pedraza (MRN)
 3. Sandra Olvera Bautista (MRN)
 4. María Isabel Alfaro Morales (MRN)
 5. Julio César Ángeles Mendoza (MRN)
 6. Lidia García Anaya (MRN)
 7. Jannet Téllez Infante (MRN)

Jalisco
 1. Eduardo Ron Ramos (MC)
 2. Martha Esthela Romo Cuéllar (PAN)
 3. Guadalupe Romo Romo (PAN)
 4. Mario Alberto Rodríguez Carrillo (MC)
 5. Lorena Jiménez Andrade (MRN)
 6. Fabiola Loya Hernández (MC)
 7. Juan Carlos Villarreal Salazar (MC)
 8. Abril Alcalá Padilla (PRD)
 9. Carmen Prudencio González (MC)
 10. Geraldina Isabel Herrera Vega (MC)
 11. Kehila Ku Escalante (MC)
 12. Adriana Gabriela Medina Ortiz (MC)
 13. Lourdes Contreras González (MC)
 14. Juan Francisco Ramírez Salcido (MC)
 15. Absalón García Ochoa (PAN)
 16. Laura Imelda Pérez Segura (PT)
 17. Juan Martín Espinoza Cárdenas (MC)
 18. Mónica Almeida López (PRD)
 19. Alberto Esquer Gutiérrez (MC)
 20. Ana Priscila González García (MC)

Mexico
 1. Ricardo Aguilar Castillo (PRI)
 2. Dionicia Vázquez García (MRN)
 3. María Teresa Marú Mejía (PT)
 4. Nelly Carrasco Godínez (MRN)
 5. Francisco Favela Peñuñuri (PT)
 6. Carolina García Aguilar (PES)
 7. Xóchitl Zagal Ramírez (PES)
 8. Gustavo Contreras Montes (MRN)
 9. Eduardo Zarzosa Sánchez (PRI)
 10. Alma Delia Navarrete Rivera (PES)
 11. María Eugenia Hernández Pérez (MRN)
 12. Felipe Rafael Arvizu de la Luz (MRN)
 13. María Elizabeth Díaz García (MRN)
 14. Claudia Domínguez Vázquez (MRN)
 15. Raúl Ernesto Sánchez Barrales (PT)
 16. Emilio Manzanilla Téllez (PT)
 17. María Guadalupe Román Ávila (MRN)
 18. Claudia Reyes Montiel (PRD)
 19. Ulises Murguía Soto (MRN)
 20. Juan Pablo Sánchez Rodríguez (MRN)
 21. Graciela Sánchez Ortiz (PES)
 22. María Teresa Rosa Mora Ríos (PT)
 23. David Orihuela Nava (MRN)
 24. Ángeles Huerta del Río (MRN)
 25. Delfino López Aparicio (MRN)
 26. Esmeralda Moreno Medina (MRN)
 27. Óscar González Yáñez (MRN)
 28. Roberto Domínguez Rodríguez (MRN)
 29. Martha Robles Ortiz (MRN)
 30. César Agustín Hernández Pérez (MRN)
 31. Juan Ángel Bautista Bravo (MRN)
 32. Luis Enrique Martínez Ventura (PT)
 33. Vicente Onofre Vázquez (MRN)
 34. Miroslava Carrillo Martínez (MRN)
 35. Arturo Roberto Hernández Tapia (PT)
 36. Cruz Roa Sánchez (PRI)
 37. Pedro Zenteno Santaella (MRN)
 38. Karla Yuritzi Almazán Burgos (MRN)
 39. José Luis Montalvo Luna (PT)
 40. Marco Antonio Reyes Colín (PT)
 41. Nancy Resendiz Hernández (PES)

Michoacan
 1. Feliciano Flores Anguiano (MRN)
 2. Esteban Barajas Barajas (MRN)
 3. Mary Carmen Bernal Martínez (PT)
 4. Armando Tejeda Cid (PAN)
 5. Yolanda Guerrero Barrera (MRN)
 6. Anita Sánchez Castro (MRN)
 7. Gonzalo Herrera Pérez (MRN)
 8. Ana Lilia Guillén Quiroz (MRN)
 9. Ignacio Campos Equihua (MRN)
 10. Ivan Arturo Pérez Negrón Ruiz (PES)
 11. José Guadalupe Aguilera Rojas (PRD)
 12. Francisco Javier Huacus Esquivel (PT)

Morelos
 1. Alejandro Mojica Toledo (PES)
 2. Alejandra Pani Barragán (MRN)
 3. Juanita Guerra Mena (PT)
 4. Jorge Argüelles Victorero (PES)
 5. José Guadalupe Ambrocio Gachuz (MRN)

Nayarit
 1. Miguel Pavel Jarero Velázquez (PT)
 2. Geraldine Ponce Méndez (MRN)
 3. Mirtha Iliana Villalvazo Amaya (MRN)

Nuevo Leon
 1. Hernán Salinas Wolberg (PAN)
 2. María Guillermina Alvarado Moreno (PES)
 3. José Luis García Duque (PT)
 4. Ricardo Flores Suárez (PAN)
 5. Santiago González Soto (PT)
 6. Annia Gómez Cárdenas (PAN)
 7. Laura Garza Gutiérrez (PT)
 8. Ernesto Vargas Contreras (PES)
 9. Juan Francisco Espinoza Eguía (PRI)
 10. José Martín López Cisneros (PAN)
 11. Ernesto Alfonso Robledo (PAN)
 12. Sandra González Castañeda (PES)

Oaxaca
 1. Irineo Molina Espinoza (MRN)
 2. Irma Juan Carlos (MRN)
 3. Margarita García García (PT)
 4. Azael Santiago Chepi (MRN)
 5. Carol Antonio Altamirano (MRN)
 6. Beatriz Pérez López (MRN)
 7. Rosalinda Domínguez Flores (MRN)
 8. Benjamín Robles Montoya (PT)
 9. Maria del Carmen Bautista Peláez (MRN)
 10. Daniel Gutiérrez Gutiérrez (MRN)

Puebla
 1. Miguel Acundo González (PES)
 2. Maiella Gómez Maldonado (MC)
 3. Claudio Báez Ruiz (PT)
 4. Inés Parra Juárez (MRN)
 5. Lizeth Sánchez García (PT)
 6. Alejandro Carvajal Hidalgo (PT)
 7. Edgar Guzmán Valdéz (PT)
 8. Julieta Vences Valencia (MRN)
 9. José Guillermo Aréchiga (MRN)
 10. Nayeli Salvatori Bojalil (PES)
 11. Saúl Huerta Corona (MRN)
 12. Fernando Manzanilla Prieto (PES)
 13. Héctor Jiménez y Meneses (MRN)
 14. Nelly Maceda Carrera (PT)
 15. Alejandro Barroso Chávez (PT)

Queretaro
 1. Sonia Rocha Acosta (PAN)
 2. Jorge Luis Montes Nieves (MRN)
 3. Beatriz Robles Gutiérrez (MRN)
 4. Felipe Macías Olvera (PAN)
 5. Ana Paola López Birlain (PAN)

Quintana Roo
 1. Adriana Teissier Zavala (PES)
 2. Patricia Palma Olvera (MRN)
 3. Mildred Ávila Vera (MRN)
 4. Jesús Pool Moo (PRD)

San Luis Potosi
 1. Sara Rocha Medina (PRI)
 2. Ricardo Gallardo Cardona (PVEM)
 3. Óscar Bautista Villegas (PRI)
 4. José Ricardo Delsol Estrada (PT)
 5. Josefina Salazar Báez (PAN)
 6. Guadalupe Almaguer Pardo (PRD)
 7. Marcelino Rivera Hernández (PAN)

Sinaloa
 1. Maximiliano Ruiz Arias (PT)
 2. Jaime Montes Salas (MRN)
 3. Jesus Garcia Hernandez (MRN)
 4. Casimiro Zamora Valdéz (MRN)
 5. Yadira Santiago Marcos (MRN)
 6. Olegaria Carrazco Macias (MRN)
 7. Merary Villegas Sanchez (MRN)

Sonora
 1. Manuel Baldenebro Arredondo (PES)
 2. Ana Gabriela Guevara (PT) 
 Ana Bernal Camarena (PT) 
 3. Lorenia Valles Sampedro (MRN)
 4. Heriberto Aguilar Castillo (MRN)
 5. Wendy Briceño Zuloaga (MRN)
 6. Javier Lamarque Cano (MRN)
 7. Hildelisa González Morales (PT)

Tabasco
 1. Estela Núñez Alvarez (PES)
 2. Teresa Burelo Cortázar (MRN)
 3. Gregorio Espadas Méndez (MRN)
 4. Manuel Rodríguez González (MRN)
 5. Laura Patricia Avalos Magaña (MRN)
 6. Ricardo de la Peña Marshall (PES)

Tamaulipas
 1. José Salvador Rosas Quintanilla (PAN)
 2. Olga Juliana Elizondo Guerra (PT)
 3. Héctor Joel Villegas González (PES)
 4. Adriana Lozano Rodríguez (PES)
 5. Mario Alberto Ramos Tamez (PAN)
 6. Vicente Verástegui Ostos (PAN)
 7. Erasmo González Robledo (MRN)
 8. Olga Patricia Sosa Ruiz (PES)
 9. Armando Javier Zertuche Zuani (PT)

Tlaxcala
 1. Jose de la Luz Sosa Salinas (MRN)
 2. Rubén Terán Águila (MRN)
 3. Lorena Cuéllar Cisneros (PES)

Veracruz
 1. Ricardo García Escalante (PAN)
 2. Jesús Guzmán Aviles (PAN)
 3. Maria Bertha Espinoza Segura (MRN)
 4. Ricardo Francisco Exsome Zapata (MRN)
 5. Raquel Bonilla Herrera (MRN)
 6. Jaime Humberto Pérez Bernabe (MRN)
 7. Rodrigo Calderón Salas (MRN)
 8. Claudia Tello Espinosa (MRN)
 9. Carmen Mora García (MRN)
 10. Rafael Hernández Villalpando (MRN)
 11. Flora Tania Cruz Santos (MRN)
 12. Mariana Dunyaska García Rojas (PAN)
 13. Eleuterio Arrieta Sánchez (MRN)
 14. Carmen Medel Palma (MRN)
 15. Dulce María Villegas Guarneros (MRN)
 16. Juan Martínez Flores (MRN)
 17. Valentín Reyes López (MRN)
 18. Bonifacio Aguilar Linda (MRN)
 19. Paola Tenorio Adame (MRN)
 20. Eulalio Ríos Fararoni (MRN)

Yucatan
 1. Jesús Carlos Vidal Peniche (PVEM)
 2. María Ester Alonzo Morales (PRI)
 3. Limbert Interian Gallegos (MRN)
 4. Elías Lixa Abimerhi (PAN)
 5. Juan José Canul Pérez (PRI)

Zacatecas
 1. Mirna Zabeida Maldonado Tapia (PES)
 2. Lyndiana Bugarín Cortes (PVEM)
 3. Alfredo Femat Bañuelos (PT)
 4. Samuel Herrera Chávez (MRN)

Deputies by proportional representation

Notes

References

External links 
 Official page of the Senate
Official page for the Chamber of Deputies

See also 

 Category:Deputies of the LXIV Legislature of Mexico

Congress of Mexico by session
2018 in Mexico